Kandia is a tehsil located in Upper Kohistan District, Khyber Pakhtunkhwa, Pakistan. The population is 84,055 according to the 2017 census.

See also 
 List of tehsils of Khyber Pakhtunkhwa

References 

Tehsils of Khyber Pakhtunkhwa